Ecija Ojdanić (born 26 June 1974) is a Croatian theatre, film and television actress.

Filmography

Television roles

Movie roles

Notes

External links

1974 births
Living people
Croatian actresses
Croatian stage actresses
Croatian film actresses
Croatian television actresses
People from Drniš